This is listing of the suburbs and localities in the greater Wollongong metropolitan area in alphabetical order.

Suburbs are listed here if they are inside the Wollongong metropolitan area and are listed in the Geographical Names Register as suburbs or localities, with some exclusions.  For this list the Wollongong metropolitan area is considered to be the Australian Bureau of Statistics's Wollongong Statistical District, which includes the Wollongong, Shellharbour and Kiama local government areas.

In some cases suburbs cross into other LGAs, or are effectively managed by other government bodies for specific purposes - these are noted where known.

Notes

References

Lists of suburbs in Australia

Wollongong-related lists